Homura is a monotypic snout moth genus in the family Pyralidae. Its only species, Homura nocturnalis, is found in Brazil. Both the genus and species were first described by Julius Lederer in 1863.

References

Moths described in 1863
Epipaschiinae
Moths of South America